Osvald Nitski (born October 6, 1997 in Montreal) is a former Estonian butterfly swimmer. He has broken Estonian records in swimming in the 1500 meter freestyle, 400 meter individual medley, and 200 meter butterfly, and Baltic records in the 1500 meter freestyle and 200 meter butterfly. He competed for his native country at the 2016 European Championships in London. He swam for the University of Toronto collegiate team and was Canadian Interuniversity Sport champion twice in 2016. He also enjoys writing poetry in his spare time.

See also
List of Estonian records in swimming
List of Baltic Records in Swimming

References

1997 births
Living people
Estonian male butterfly swimmers
Estonian male freestyle swimmers
Estonian male medley swimmers
Swimmers from Montreal
Estonian expatriate sportspeople in Canada
University of Toronto alumni